Amadou Ba Zeund Georges Mvom Onana (born 16 August 2001) is a Belgian professional footballer who plays as a defensive midfielder for  club Everton and the Belgium national team.

Club career

Hamburger SV 
Onana joined 2. Bundesliga club Hamburger SV in mid-2020. He made his professional debut for the club in the first round of the 2020–21 DFB-Pokal on 14 September 2020, coming on as a substitute in the 60th minute against 3. Liga side Dynamo Dresden. He scored a header in the 89th minute of the match, which finished as a 1–4 away loss.

Lille 
In  August 2021, Onana joined Ligue 1 club Lille on a five year deal. He made 32 league appearances in 2021–22, scoring once.

Everton 
Onana signed for Premier League club Everton on a five-year contract on 9 August 2022 for a reported £33m including add-ons. Onana scored his first Premier League goal for Everton, a header from a corner, in the 1–2 home defeat against Southampton on 14 January 2023.

International career
On 18 May 2022, Onana was named to the squad for the four 2022–23 UEFA Nations League matches on 3, 8, 10 and 13 June 2022 against Netherlands, Poland (twice) and Wales respectively. Onana made his full international debut against the Netherlands on 3 June 2022.

On 10 November 2022, Onana was named in the final 26-man squad for the 2022 FIFA World Cup in Qatar.

Career statistics

Club

International

Personal life
Onana is of Cameroonian and Senegalese descent.

References

External links

 Amadou Onana at Everton F.C.
 
 

2001 births
Living people
Footballers from Dakar
Belgian footballers
Association football midfielders
S.V. Zulte Waregem players
RWS Bruxelles players
R.S.C. Anderlecht players
TSG 1899 Hoffenheim II players
Hamburger SV players
Lille OSC players
Everton F.C. players
Regionalliga players
2. Bundesliga players
Ligue 1 players
Premier League players
Belgium youth international footballers
Belgium under-21 international footballers
Belgium international footballers
2022 FIFA World Cup players
Belgian expatriate footballers
Expatriate footballers in England
Expatriate footballers in France
Expatriate footballers in Germany
Belgian expatriate sportspeople in England
Belgian expatriate sportspeople in France
Belgian expatriate sportspeople in Germany
Belgian people of Cameroonian descent
Belgian people of Senegalese descent
Belgian sportspeople of African descent
Senegalese emigrants to Belgium
Naturalised citizens of Belgium